The 51st Venice Biennale, held in 2005, was an exhibition of international contemporary art. The Venice Biennale takes place biennially in Venice, Italy. Prizewinners included Barbara Kruger (lifetime achievement), the French pavilion with Annette Messager (best national representation), Thomas Schütte (best in International Exhibition), and Regina José Galindo (best young artist).

References

Bibliography

Further reading 

 
 
 
 
 
 
 
 
 

2005 in art
2005 in Italy
Venice Biennale exhibitions